Be My Guest (12 April 1974 – 19 February 2004) was an American-bred, Irish-trained Thoroughbred racehorse and champion sire in Britain. He was bred in Kentucky by Walter Haefner, a Swiss businessman and owner of Moyglare Stud Farm in Ireland. Sired by Northern Dancer, his dam was What a Treat, the 1965 American Champion Three-Year-Old Filly and a daughter of the 1947 2,000 Guineas Stakes winner, Tudor Minstrel.

Be My Guest was sold at the 1975 Goffs  yearling sale for a then British and European record price of 127,000 guineas.  His new owner, Diana Guest Manning, was the daughter of Frederick Guest and his wife Amy Phipps of the American Phipps family who have been major long-time figures in thoroughbred racing in the United States.

Progeny
Be My Guest was a very good miler who won three Group races at age three in 1977 under trainer Vincent O'Brien. These victories included the Waterford Crystal Mile. He is also  remembered as one of the foundation sires responsible for turning Ireland's Coolmore Stud into one of the most important Thoroughbred breeders in the world. .

Syndicated for £800,000, during his career at stud Be My Guest sired 78 stakes winners who were able to win at various distances. He was the Leading sire in Great Britain and Ireland in 1982. In addition, Be My Guest's daughters produced more than 90 stakes winners. Some of his notable progeny were:

Sire:
 Assert (b. 1979) - won four Group One races at age three including the Irish and French Derbys;
 On the House (b. 1979) - won the 1982 G1 Classic, the 1,000 Guineas Stakes, and the G1 Sussex Stakes;
 Luth Enchantee (b. 1980) - a filly who beat her male counterparts in winning the Group Ones Prix du Moulin de Longchamp and Prix Jacques le Marois;
 Go and Go (b. 1987) - won the Belmont Stakes, the third and longest leg of the United States Triple Crown series;
 Pentire (b. 1992) - multiple conditions race winner including the 1995 King George VI and Queen Elizabeth Diamond Stakes,  Irish Champion Stakes, and Eclipse Stakes.

Damsire:
 Rock of Gibraltar (1999) - won a world record seven consecutive Group One races
 Manduro (b. 2002) - No. 1 ranked horse in the World in 2007

Pensioned after the 2002 breeding season , Be My Guest died on 19 February 2004 at the age of thirty.

Pedigree

References

 Be My Guest's pedigree and partial racing stats
 February 24, 2004 Bloodhorse.com article titled Be My Guest, Sired 78 Stakes Winners, Dead at Age 30

1974 racehorse births
2004 racehorse deaths
Racehorses bred in Kentucky
Racehorses trained in Ireland
British Champion Thoroughbred Sires
Phipps family
Thoroughbred family 8-c